Laxman Vasudev Paranjape, was a member of the Hindu nationalist organisation Rashtriya Swayamsevak Sangh (RSS), along with its first Sarsanghchalak Keshav Baliram Hedgewar. Paranjape also served as the Acting Sarsanghchalak (1930–1931) when Hedgewar went to jail during the Forest Satyagraha.

Early life
The family of Paranjape was belonging to the small place called Wada in Konkan. He was born on 20 November 1877 in Nagpur. He did his schooling in Wardha till 9th and later moved to Nagpur. He completed his schooling from Neel City High School and got medical degree from Grant Medical College, Mumbai. He started serving in Nagpur from 1904 after his graduation.

Dr. Paranjape was married to Umabai.

Career
In the 1920 session of the Indian National Congress held in Nagpur, which was the biggest conference ever then, a total number of 14583 delegates were present.  A volunteer organisation called Bharat Swayamsewak Mandal was formed by Paranjape and Hedgewar, had undertaken the arrangements of the conference. All the volunteers were asked to wear a uniform, which was later adopted by the RSS as its own official uniform from 1925 to 1940. He was instrumental in increasing RSS branches during his tenure.

References

Rashtriya Swayamsevak Sangh
Rashtriya Swayamsevak Sangh members
1877 births
1958 deaths
Sarsanghchalaks